Children and Art is an album by Mandy Patinkin, released by Nonesuch Records on October 25, 2019.

Track listing
 "Going to a Town" (Rufus Wainwright)
 "Kentucky Avenue"
 "If I Had a Boat"
 "From the Air"
 "So Long Dad"
 "Children and Art"
 "To Be of Use"
 "My Mom"
 "Wandering Boy" (Randy Newman)
 "Fear Itself / Sarabande"
 "Raggedy Ann"
 "Refugees / Song of the Titanic"

Track listing adapted from Playbill

References

2019 albums
Mandy Patinkin albums
Nonesuch Records albums